The Rönne (Swedish: Rönne å) is a river in Scania, Sweden with a length of 83 kilometers. The Rönne flows from Ringsjön and opens into Skälderviken in Ängelholm.

References

Rivers of Skåne County